Jermaine Williams is a former professional American football running back in the NFL. He played college football for the University of Houston. He was originally signed as an undrafted free agent by the Tampa Bay Buccaneers. While in the NFL, he played five seasons for the Oakland Raiders, Jacksonville Jaguars,   and Kansas City Chiefs. He played 7 seasons in his career. Jermaine is married to Kimberly Williams. They have three children.

Notes

References

1973 births
American football running backs
Oakland Raiders players
Jacksonville Jaguars players
Kansas City Chiefs players
Houston Cougars football players
Butler Grizzlies football players
Living people